Mohsenabad (also Romanized as Moḩsenābād; also known as Mohsīnābād and Mūhsīnabād) is a village in Pain Velayat Rural District, in the Central District of Taybad County, Razavi Khorasan Province, Iran. At the 2006 census, its population was 861, in 167 families.

References 

Populated places in Taybad County